Owen Fussey (born April 2, 1983) is a Canadian-British former professional ice hockey forward. He was selected 90th overall in the 2001 NHL Entry Draft by the Washington Capitals and played four games for them during the 2003-04 NHL season. He later played in Europe, namely the United Kingdom's Elite Ice Hockey League, as well as the Great Britain national team.

Playing career 
Born in Winnipeg, Manitoba, Fussey spent four seasons in Canada's Western Hockey League (WHL) with the Calgary Hitmen and Moose Jaw Warriors before moving to the American Hockey League (AHL) in 2003. That same season he was called up to the National Hockey League (NHL) to play in four games for the Washington Capitals, in which he scored one point for an assist.

Fussey spent the next three seasons in the AHL, playing for the Portland Pirates, Hershey Bears (winning the Calder Cup in the 2005-06 season) and Toronto Marlies before moving to the ECHL in 2006, spending two seasons with the Columbia Inferno.

In 2008 Fussey moved to Europe to play in the Italian Serie A league for HC Fassa, and moved to Britain the following season with Edinburgh Capitals in the Elite Ice Hockey League (EIHL).

In 2010 Fussey was signed by Coventry Blaze, the then-reigning Elite League champions. In 2012, Fussey represented the Great Britain national team at the 2012 IIHF World Championship Division 1A.

After two years away from the game, Fussey returned in 2014 to sign for the Guildford Flames of the second-tier English Premier Ice Hockey League. He played 19 games for Guildford before he was released in December of the same year.

Career statistics

Regular season and playoffs

International

References

External links

1983 births
Living people
Canadian ice hockey forwards
Calgary Hitmen players
Columbia Inferno players
Edinburgh Capitals players
Guildford Flames players
Hershey Bears players
Ice hockey people from Winnipeg
Moose Jaw Warriors players
Portland Pirates players
SHC Fassa players
St. Boniface Saints (ice hockey) players
Toronto Marlies players
Washington Capitals draft picks
Washington Capitals players
Canadian expatriate ice hockey players in England
Canadian expatriate ice hockey players in Scotland
Canadian expatriate ice hockey players in Italy
Naturalised citizens of the United Kingdom